San Bartolomé may refer to the following places:

Guatemala
San Bartolomé Jocotenango, a municipality in El Quiché department
San Bartolomé Milpas Altas, a municipality in Sacatepéquez department

Mexico

In Oaxaca State:
San Bartolomé Ayautla
San Bartolomé Loxicha
San Bartolomé Quialana
San Bartolomé Yucuañe
San Bartolomé Zoogocho

Spain
San Bartolomé (Belmonte), a civil parish in Belmonte de Miranda, Asturias
San Bartolomé, Las Palmas, on the island of Lanzarote in the Canary Islands 
San Bartolomé de Tirajana, on the island of Gran Canaria in the Canary Islands

See also
Church of San Bartolomé (disambiguation)